Events from the 1240s in England.

Incumbents
Monarch – Henry III

Events
 1240
Dafydd ap Llywelyn, Prince of Wales, pays homage to King Henry III and agrees to arbitration over the right to rule Wales.
 Old St Paul's Cathedral in London is consecrated.
 First perambulation of Dartmoor.
 1241
 1 February – Boniface of Savoy, the Queen's uncle, is enthroned as Archbishop of Canterbury.
 10 August – Eleanor, Fair Maid of Brittany dies captive at Bristol, ending the senior line of Geoffrey II, Duke of Brittany.
 October – After defeat in a military campaign, Dafydd ap Llywelyn makes Henry his heir.
 1242
 May – English army supports rebels in Poitou against French rule.
 Royal troops seize the island of Lundy, occupied by the fugitive William de Marisco.
 1243
 September – England signs a truce with France.
 1244
 Dafydd ap Llywelyn forms alliance of minor Welsh rulers in Wales and begins revolt against English rule.
 August – Henry blockades Scotland and musters an army at Newcastle upon Tyne after Scots threaten the border.
 November – Bishops and barons refuse to pay taxes demanded by King Henry, and insist on administrative reforms.
 1245
 English army campaigns in north Wales to subdue Dafydd ap Llywelyn. A truce is agreed in the autumn, and Henry returns to England.
 Crutched Friars established in England.
 The rebuilding of Westminster Abbey in Gothic style begins.
 1246
Cistercians, together with the King's brother, Richard, 1st Earl of Cornwall, found Hailes Abbey in Gloucestershire.
 Dafydd ap Llywelyn, who had lately claimed the title of prince of Wales, dies and the resistance of the Welsh against English forces in Wales collapses.
 1247
 April – Treaty of Woodstock: Dafydd ap Llywelyn's successors, the Welsh princes Llywelyn ap Gruffudd and Owain ap Gruffudd acknowledge Henry as their overlord.
 13 June – Coinage reform introduces a new silver coin and establishes seventeen local mints.
 Romford established as a market town.
 The Bethlem Royal Hospital founded in London.
 1248
 11 March – Richard of Cornwall presides at the first Trial of the Pyx to determine the purity of coinage.
 Simon de Montfort, 6th Earl of Leicester appointed as governor of Gascony, but soon proves unpopular.
 1249
 Spring – Bequest of William of Durham for the support of scholars in the University of Oxford, considered as the establishment of University College there.

Births
 1240
 29 September – Margaret of England, daughter of Henry III of England and consort of Alexander III of Scotland (died 1275)
 1241
Eleanor of Castile, queen of Edward I of England (died 1290)
 1243
 2 September – Gilbert de Clare, 6th Earl of Hertford, politician (died 1295)
 1245
 16 January – Edmund Crouchback, 1st Earl of Lancaster, son of Henry III of England (died 1296)
 1246
 14 September – John FitzAlan, 7th Earl of Arundel (died 1272)
 1247
Little Saint Hugh of Lincoln (died 1255)
 1249
Humphrey de Bohun, 3rd Earl of Hereford (died 1297)

Deaths
 1240
Edmund Rich, Archbishop of Canterbury (born 1175)
 William de Warenne, 5th Earl of Surrey (born 1166)
 1241
 10 August – Eleanor, Fair Maid of Brittany, daughter of Geoffrey II, Duke of Brittany (born 1184)
 1 December – Isabella of England, princess (born 1214)
 1242
 26 March – William de Forz, 3rd Earl of Albemarle (year of birth unknown)
 1243
 12 May – Hubert de Burgh, 1st Earl of Kent (born c. 1165)
 1245
 c. June – Elias of Dereham, canon and building designer
 21 August – Alexander of Hales, theologian
 1246
 31 May – Isabella of Angoulême, queen of John of England (born c. 1187)
 Thomas De Melsonby, last hermit of the Farne Islands
Richard Fitz Roy, illegitimate son of King John (born c. 1190)
 1247
William de Ferrers, 4th Earl of Derby (born c. 1168)

References